Ukrainian Choice, officially since 2016 named Ukrainian Choice – Right of the People, is an NGO in Ukraine. It was initiated by and is led by the business tycoon Viktor Medvedchuk. In Ukraine it is considered a pro-Russian organisation.

After the beginning of the 2022 Russian invasion of Ukraine, the activities of the organization actually ceased, and its leaders were detained by the SBU on charges of preparing a coup d'état and collaborating with Russian special services.

Ideology
The organization was founded in April 2012 and is noticed to oppose European Union and NATO membership of Ukraine and would prefer Ukraine to join the Eurasian Economic Union instead. The group also wants "decentralization of power followed by the transition to a federal structure, while maintaining the territorial integrity and unity of Ukraine".

Ukrainian Choice also emphasizes Slavic Orthodox values: in July 2013, it organized a conference on the topic "Orthodox-Slavic values – the basics of the civilizational choice of Ukraine", where Vladimir Putin held a speech. (Putin is the godfather of Medvedchuk's 2004 born daughter Darina).

Activities
According to The New York Times the group aimed at stopping former president Viktor Yanukovych from signing Ukraine's Association Agreement with the European Union. In a leaked June 2013 Russian-ordered consultation document, whose contents have been corroborated by a former security source in Ukraine, the Russian government wanted Ukrainian Choice to influence public opinion. At the time Medvedchuk and the organization had marginal popular support in Ukraine.

In the fall of 2013, Ukrainian Choice ran an aggressive anti-gay ad campaign warning against "decayed values" in the Western world. Some of the ads claimed that association with the European Union would mean the legalization of same-sex marriage. At the time, Medvedchuk described the European Union as the "modern heir to the Third Reich."

During annexation of Crimea by the Russian Federation in March 2014, the organization organized blockage of Ukrainian military logistics.

Criticism
Former president of Ukraine Leonid Kravchuk stated in 2012 that "The Ukrainian Choice is not a Ukrainian choice, but a choice of Russia in Ukraine".

Dmitry Alekseev, a Russian political technologist and director general of Russia's National Political Agency, said in December 2013 that Russia was trying to "forge" pro-Russian politicians in Ukraine, so it was funding Viktor Medvedchuk's Ukrainian Choice project, as previously funded by Natalia Vitrenko's Progressive Socialist Party of Ukraine.

On February 26, 2014, deputies of the Zakarpattia Oblast Council banned the activities of Viktor Medvedchuk's "Ukrainian Choice" in the region.

"Ukrainian Choice" is also accused of anti-Semitism for articles on the organization's website, which accuses Jews of allegedly owning all power in Ukraine.

In March 2021 the Security Service of Ukraine (SBU) searched "Ukrainian Choice" offices across Ukraine as part of their investigation theses that the organisation helped to organize the Crimean referendum during the 2014 Russian annexation of Crimea. The SBU also claimed that the organisation continued to coordinate the activities of its members in the Autonomous Republic of Crimea "despite attempts to publicly distance themselves from the illegal actions of their colleagues on the peninsula." "Ukrainian Choice" officially liquidated its Crimean branch in 2017.

References

External links
Official website of Ukrainian Choice 

Political organizations based in Ukraine
Political parties established in 2012
Political parties disestablished in 2022
Russian nationalism in Ukraine
Antisemitism in Ukraine
Anti-Ukrainian sentiment
Neo-Sovietism